Lechenaultia striata is a species of flowering plant in the family Goodeniaceae and is endemic to arid inland areas of Australia. It is an ascending herb or subshrub with only a few wand-like branches, crowded, narrow fleshy leaves and pale blue to pale yellow or creamy-white flowers.

Description
The flowers are arranged in loose groups and are pale blue to pale yellow or creamy-white.

Taxonomy
Lechenaultia striata was first formally described in 1874 by Ferdinand von Mueller in his Fragmenta Phytographiae Australiae from specimens collected near the Olgas by Ernest Giles. The specific epithet (striata) means "striated", referring to the stems and leaves.

Distribution and habitat
This leschenaultia grows inTriodia grassland or scrub in arid and semi-arid areas of eastern Western Australia, western inland South Australia and south-western Northern Territory.

Conservation status
This leschenaultia is listed as "not threatened" by the Government of Western Australia Department of Biodiversity, Conservation and Attractions.

References

Asterales of Australia
striata
Eudicots of Western Australia
Flora of South Australia
Flora of the Northern Territory
Plants described in 1874
Taxa named by Ferdinand von Mueller